Any Time Now may refer to:

 Any Time Now (O.A.R. album)
 Any Time Now (The Outfield album)
 Any Time Now (TV series), a 2002 Irish comedy-drama

See also
 Any Day Now (disambiguation)